Mercy College is a Roman Catholic co-education secondary school situated in the Ballysillan area of north Belfast, Northern Ireland.

Academics
The school provides instruction in a range of academic subjects. At GCSE A-Level, instruction is offered in Irish, History, Art, Sociology, Mathematics, Government & Politics, ICT, English Literature, Media Studies and Drama.

See also 
 List of secondary schools in Belfast

References  

Secondary schools in Belfast
Catholic secondary schools in Northern Ireland